Brannerion is an extinct genus of prehistoric bonefish. Fossils of the genus were found in the Romualdo Formation of the Santana Group, Araripe Basin, northeastern Brazil.

See also 

 Prehistoric fish
 List of prehistoric bony fish

References 

Prehistoric ray-finned fish genera
Prehistoric fish of South America
Early Cretaceous animals of South America
Cretaceous Brazil
Fossils of Brazil
Romualdo Formation
Fossil taxa described in 1920